Kosuke Okahara (born 1980) is a Japanese photographer who covers social issues in the tradition of humanistic documentary photography.

Okahara is a winner of PDNs 30, Joop Swart Masterclass of World Press Photo,  Eugene Smith Fellowship, Getty Images Grant, and Pierre & Alexandra Boulat Award.

Biography 
Okahara was born in Tokyo, Japan. After a period of training and competing in freestyle skiing at the international level, he studied education at Waseda University. Upon obtaining his degree, he embarked on a career as a photographer, alternating between news- reporting and long-term personal projects. His initial trip led him to Sudan (2004), Burma (2007), China (2007), as well as his first trip to Colombia (2006).

In 2004, he began "Ibasyo" a long-term photographic essay on adolescent self-harm in Japan. Japanese society generally ignores this phenomenon as it considers it to be shameful. Okahara took on the pluralistic roles of photographer, close friend, witness, and social worker. One of his series that he photographed in Colombia has been published and exhibited as a part of "100 years of Leica photography".

Other topics he has photographed are the Arab Spring, the chaos on the Russian periphery, and migrants around Calais in 2008. Since the Fukushima nuclear accident in 2011, he documents the region devastated by the disaster with a particular attention given to the signs of time. This latter work is the subject of a book, Fukushima Fragments (2015).

Okahara was a member of Agence VU' between 2007 and 2010.

Books 
 Contact #1 -Any given day-. Backyard Project, 2013.
 Vanishing Existence. Backyard Project, 2013.
 Ibasyo Book Journey. Handependent, 2014.
 Almost Paradise. Only Photography, 2014.
 Fukushima Fragments. France: Martinière, 2015. .
 Ibasyo. Japan: Kousakusha, 2018. .
 blue affair. Japan: THE BACKYARD, 2020

Awards 

2008: Overseas Training Grant for Emerging Artist, Agency for Cultural Affairs, Japanese Government
2008: Special Mention, Prix Kodak
2009: Photo District News PDN's 30
2009: Sony World Photography Awards
2009: World Press Photo Joop Swart Masterclass
2010: Fellowship, W. Eugene Smith Memorial Fund Grant
2012: Finalist, European Publishers Award
2012: Getty Images Grants for Editorial Photography, Perpignan
2013: Festival Photoreporter en Baie de Saint-Brieuc Grant
2014: Pierre & Alexandra Boulat Award, Perpignan
2017 · Saint-Brieuc Festival Grant
2021 · Jury's Special Mention, 20th Las Palmas de Grand Canaria International Film Festival
2021 · Best Contemporary Experimental Short, 16th Sapporo International Short Film Festival
2022 · Regional Prize - Asia, Open format category, World Press Photo

Exhibitions

Solo exhibitions 
Resistance, Nikon Salon, Tokyo, 2005; Nikon Salon, Osaka, Japan, 2005; Foreign Correspondents' Club of Thailand, Bangkok, 2006.
Ibasyo, Kunsthal, Rotterdam, The Netherlands, 2011.
Surviving for existence – Abkhazia, the country that doesn't exist,. Festival Photoreporter, Saint-Brieuc, France, 2013.
Fukushima Fragments, Photo Antalya, Antalya, Turkey, 2015.
Almost Paradise, Only Photography Gallery, Berlin, 2015.
Fukushima Fragments, Polka Gallery, Paeis, 2016.

Group exhibitions 
 100 years of Leica Photography, House of Photography, Hamburg, Germany, 2015; C/O Berlin, Berlin, 2015.

References

External links 
 
 Polka Galerie, Paris
 A documentary film by Japanese NHK. (2015)
 "Ibasyo" -Okahara's long term project on Asia Society website

1980 births
Living people
Japanese photojournalists